Cross of Fire is a 1989 American television miniseries based on the rape and murder of Madge Oberholtzer by D. C. Stephenson, a highly successful leader of the Indiana branch of Ku Klux Klan. It stars John Heard as Stephenson and Mel Harris as Oberholtzer.  Lloyd Bridges is also in the cast.  It was originally shown in two parts (2 hours each night). The first was watched by 17.5 million viewers and the second by 20.4 million. In syndication, it is shown as a television movie.

Awards
Emmy Award for Outstanding Sound Mixing for a Drama Miniseries or a Special-for Part 1

References

External links

American films based on actual events
Films directed by Paul Wendkos
1980s American television miniseries
1989 American television series debuts
Television series set in the 1920s
Films about the Ku Klux Klan
1989 films